Florian Templ (born 1 October 1988) is an Austrian footballer who plays for Union Weißkirchen.

Career

Union Weißkirchen
On 1 July 2019, Templ moved to Union Weißkirchen after two seasons with FC Blau-Weiß Linz.

References

External links
Florian Templ at Union Weißkirchen's website

Austrian footballers
Austrian Football Bundesliga players
2. Liga (Austria) players
1988 births
Living people
SV Mattersburg players
LASK players
FC Blau-Weiß Linz players
Association football forwards